The Jämtland-Härjedalens Fotbollförbund (Jämtland-Härjedalen Football Association) is one of the 24 district organisations of the Swedish Football Association. It administers lower tier football in the historical provinces of Jämtland and Härjedalen.

Background 

Jämtland-Härjedalens Fotbollförbund, commonly referred to as Jämtland-Härjedalens FF, is the governing body for football in the historical provinces of Jämtland and Härjedalen, the corresponding area now being covered by Jämtland County. The Association was formed in 1928 and currently has 63 member clubs.  Based in Östersund, the Association's Chairman is Leif Nilsson.

Affiliated Members 

The following clubs are affiliated to the Jämtland-Härjedalens FF:

Alsens IF
Aspås IF
Bergs IK
Bispgårdens IF
BK Björnen
Bräcke SK
Brunflo FK
Duveds IF
Fåkers IK
Fältjägarnas IF
Fåssjö IK
Fjällsjö BK
Föllinge IK
Frösö IF
Frostvikens FF
Funäsdalens IF
Genvalla IF
Hackås IF
Häggenås SK
Häggenås-Lit-Kyrkås FF
Häljesund-Kvitsle IF
Hallens SK
Hammerdals IF
Hede IK
Hotings IF
IFK Kyrktåsjö
IFK Lit
IFK Östersund
IFK Strömsund
Järpens IF
Kälarne IK
Klövsjö IF
Krokom Dvärsätts IF
Kyrkås IF
Lillhärdals IF
Mårdsjöns IF
Marieby GOIF
Mattmar SK
Mörsils IF
Myssjö-Ovikens IF
Näldens IF
Norra Lits IF
Offerdals IF
Ope IF
Orrvikens IK
Pilgrimstads IF
Ragunda BK
Rätans IF
Rödöns SK
Rossöns IF
Störåsens Bygdegårds och IF
Stuguns BK
Sundsjö IF
Svegs IK
Tandsbyns FK
Vemdalens IF
Vemhåns IK
Ytterhogdals IK
Åre Sk
Ås IF
Älvros IK
Östersunds DFF
Östersunds FK

League Competitions 
Jämtland-Härjedalens FF run the following League Competitions:

Men's Football
Division 4  -  one section
Division 5  -  two sections

Women's Football
Division 3  -  one section
Division 4  -  one section

Footnotes

External links 
 Jämtland-Härjedalens FF Official Website 

Jamtland
Football in Jämtland County
Sports organizations established in 1928
1928 establishments in Sweden